The Wisconsin School of Business (WSB) is the business school of the University of Wisconsin–Madison, a public research university in Madison, Wisconsin and consistently ranks among the top business schools in the world. Founded in 1900, it has more than 45,000 living alumni. The undergraduate program prepares students for business careers, while its Master of Business Administration (MBA) program is based on focused career specializations, and its PhD program prepares students for careers in academia. The school offers student services, such as Accenture Leadership Center, The Huber Business Analytics Lab and International Programs. In the 2019 U.S. News & World Report rankings, the Wisconsin School of Business's undergraduate program was ranked 18th overall among business schools. The University of Wisconsin-Madison currently has the most Fortune 500 CEOs alumni of any school in the world, with 14.

School name 
In 2005 the Wisconsin School of Business Dean Michael Knetter began approaching alumni with the idea for the naming grant. He asked them to donate $5 million each in the interest of maintaining the school's name as the Wisconsin School of Business for the next 20 years. On October 27, 2007 the Wisconsin School of Business announced the receipt of an $85 million naming gift. A group of 13 alumni known as the "Wisconsin Naming Partnership" donated a minimum of $5 million each.  Usually a school changes its name after receiving a large donation from a single donor or a small group. The agreement made with the Wisconsin Naming Partnership was that the business school would keep its name for the next 20 years, after which the school could change its name if it received another sufficient donation.

Rankings

In the 2011 U.S. News & World Report rankings, the Wisconsin School of Business's undergraduate program was ranked 13th overall among business schools, 7th among public institutions, and third among Big Ten business schools. Its undergraduate degree programs ranked nationally as follows:

Real Estate #1

Risk Management #2

Marketing #9

Quantitative analysis, finance, accounting, and management programs all ranking in the top 20 nationally. The school's MBA program was ranked 29th. The Financial Times ranked Wisconsin's Executive Education programs 14th in the U.S. and 28th in the world. Business Week ranked the Wisconsin MBA 4th fastest in the U.S. for the return on investment. In 2009, Business Week ranked the Wisconsin MBA finance specializations 26th in the  nation.  In 2020, the Marketing specialization for the Full Time MBA was ranked 5th in the Princeton Review's Best MBA for Marketing. In 2012, the Aspen Institute ranked the Wisconsin MBA program 17th worldwide and 15th in the U.S. in "Beyond Grey Pinstripes," a list of the top 100 business schools for environmental, social, and ethical management education.

The University of Wisconsin–Madison as a whole was ranked 35th in the U.S., seventh among public universities, and third among Big Ten schools. The rankings are based solely on the judgments of deans and senior faculty who responded to an invitation to nominate peer institutions on a scale of 1 (marginal) to 5 (distinguished). A total of 38 percent of those surveyed responded. Specialty areas were ranked based on the number of nominations received from respondents.

Centers and Initiatives

A.C. Nielsen Center for Marketing Analytics and Insights 
The A.C. Nielsen Center was established in 1990 through a donation from Gertrude Nielsen, and Mr. & Mrs. Arthur C. Nielsen Jr. and named for American businessman, electrical engineer and market research analyst Arthur Charles Nielsen. The center trains students in the specialized ideas, issues and techniques of marketing research, consumer insights, and analytics.

Arthur Andersen Center for Financial Reporting and Control 
The Arthur Andersen Center was established in February 1992 through an endowment from partners, staff, and retired partners of Arthur Andersen, and additional support from the Arthur Andersen Foundation. Programs supported by the center include the Integrated Master of Accountancy (IMAcc), Graduate Master of Accountancy (GMAcc), and PhD in accounting.

Bolz Center for Arts Administration 
The Bolz Center for Arts Administration supports the oldest and longest running graduate program in arts administration in the world. The center was founded in 1993 with support from a gift by the Eugenie Mayer Bolz Family Foundation.

Center for Brand and Product Management 
The Center for Brand and Product Management (CBPM) supports students, alumni, and the marketing industry through training in brand management and offers an MBA specialization in Brand and Product Management.

Erdman Center for Operations and Technology Management 
The Erdman Center supports full-time MBA students in the specialization of operations and technology management, and also provides Yellow Belt and Green Belt training in Six Sigma. Originally called the Erdman Center for Manufacturing and Technology Management, the center was officially renamed in 2004.

Grainger Center for Supply Chain Management 
At its founding in 1991, the Grainger Center was the nation's first endowed, specialized program in supply chain management. Supported programs include undergraduate and graduate degrees in supply chain management, as well as an MBA specialization in supply chain management, which was ranked as a top-ten supply chain graduate program by Gartner in 2018.  In the 2020-21 academic year, the program began offering the new undergraduate major in supply chain management.

Hawk Center for Investment Analysis 
The Stephen L. Hawk Center for Investment Analysis supports graduate and undergraduate investment education, including serving as the home of the Applied Security Analysis Program (ASAP), where students manage in excess of $20 million in portfolios of equity, investment grade, high yield and Treasury bonds.

James A. Graaskamp Center for Real Estate 
Under the instruction of economist Richard T. Ely, the University of Wisconsin established the Institute for Research in Land Economics in 1920, and in 1971, the institute became the Center for Real Estate. In 2007, the center was officially renamed for James A. Graaskamp, a former professor and department chairman of real estate at the university. The center supports graduate and undergraduate education in real estate. In 2020, the real estate program at the university was ranked the second-best real estate program in the US, and the first among public universities.

Nicholas Center for Corporate Finance and Investment Banking 
The Nicholas Center supports the University of Wisconsin's MBA program in Corporate Finance and Investment Banking. The center was established in 2003 through a $6.4 million gift from Albert O. "Ab" Nicholas, former chairman, CEO, and portfolio manager of Nicholas Company, Inc.

Puelicher Center for Banking Education 
The Puelicher Center for Banking Education, established in 1995, is an endowed center focused on undergraduate education in commercial and investment banking, research in banking practices, and partnerships in financial intermediation.

Robert Beyer Center for Managerial Accounting and Control 
The Robert Beyer Center for Managerial Accounting and Control is affiliated with the Accounting and Information Systems department of the Wisconsin School of Business and supports research by managerial accounting faculty.

Weinert Center for Entrepreneurship 
The Weinert Center provides teaching, research, and service pertaining to entrepreneurial management and enterprise development. In 2009, it was named a National Model MBA Entrepreneurship Program by the United States Association for Small Business and Entrepreneurship.

Admissions
The Wisconsin School of Business accepts most of its students through either direct admission from high school or the pre-business route, where students apply the spring of their freshman year. The BBA program has approximately 2,500 students. The Spring 2015 semester had admission rates of 57% for students applying under the pre-business standards.

The full-time Wisconsin MBA is designed around career specializations, instead of general academic majors, and many of the specializations are linked to a Center of Expertise. Applicants to the program apply for admission to these specializations in order to be admitted to the Wisconsin School of Business.

Student life
The Wisconsin Undergraduate Business Council represents the interests of students through a Student Senate and student outreach events throughout the year. There are over 45 student organizations, business fraternities, and five student committees. There are student organizations for each of the 10 majors, as well as organizations for other student interests, such as investment banking and socially responsible business. Diverse interests are represented through the Multicultural Business Student Organization, Women in Business, Asian Business and Economic Student Association, and the National Association of Black Accountants.

Students can participate in over 30 study abroad opportunities, as well as student-run workshops by the Accenture Leadership Center.

Degree programs
The Wisconsin School of Business offers over several majors for students interested in business, including: Accounting, Actuarial Science, Finance, Investment, and Banking, Information Systems, International Business, Management and Human Resources, Marketing, Operations and Technology Management, Real Estate, and Risk Management and Insurance.

Non-degree programs
The UW-Madison Executive Education program offers over 70 open enrollment courses in a variety of business and financial topics. In 2009, Executive Education introduced the Professional Development Certificate and the Master Practitioner designation.

Notable alumni 
 Steve Bennett, CEO, Symantec, BBA'76
 Thomas J. Falk, Chairman and CEO, Kimberly-Clark
 David J. Lesar, CEO, Halliburton
 John Morgridge, Chairman Emeritus, Cisco Systems
 Albert Nicholas, Chairman & CEO, Nicholas Company Inc.
 Paul F. Reilly, Judge of the Wisconsin Court of Appeals
 Lewis Wolff, Real estate developer and former owner of the MLB team the Oakland Athletics
 Randall Boe, former General Counsel, AOL
 Jerome A. Chazen, the current Founder and Chairman of Chazen Capital Partners. He is also one of four founders of Liz Claiborne.
 M. J. Cleary, Former President, Northwestern Mutual Life Insurance Company
 Donald Goerke, Executive at Campbell Soup Company and the inventor of SpaghettiOs
 Kevin Mather, the President and minority owner of the Seattle Mariners of Major League Baseball
 Stephen S. Roach, Chief Economist, Morgan Stanley
 John Rowe, Chairman and CEO, Exelon

References

Wisconsin's Twist on the Name Game

External links

Official Wisconsin School of Business website
Official Executive Education website

University of Wisconsin–Madison
Business schools in Wisconsin